Rudolf Troppert (26 March 1909 – 1999) was an Austrian weightlifter. He competed in the men's lightweight event at the 1936 Summer Olympics.

References

External links
 

1909 births
1999 deaths
Austrian male weightlifters
Olympic weightlifters of Austria
Weightlifters at the 1936 Summer Olympics
Sportspeople from Vienna
20th-century Austrian people